The Samsung E3210 (or Hero) is a mobile phone designed for a lower budget smartphone market. It features J2ME applications

The battery supports up to 23 days of standby (3G: 14 days) or 8 hours of talk time (3G: 3 hours).

SAR 0.715 W/kg

References

External links
 official page

E3210
Mobile phones introduced in 2011